The 1981 Toyota Tennis Classic was a women's singles tennis tournament played on indoor carpet courts in Atlanta, Georgia in the United States. The event was part of the  category 2 tournaments of the 1981 Toyota Series. It was the sixth edition of the tournament and was held from September 21 through September 27, 1981. First-seeded Tracy Austin won the singles title and earned 75 ranking points.

Finals

Singles
 Tracy Austin defeated  Mary-Lou Piatek 4–6, 6–3, 6–3
It was Austin's 6th singles title of the year and the 27th of her career.

Doubles
 Laura duPont /  Betsy Nagelsen defeated  Rosie Casals /  Candy Reynolds 6–4, 7–5

Ranking points

Notes

References

External links
 International Tennis Federation (ITF) tournament edition details

Toyota Tennis Classic
Toyota Tennis Classic
Toyota Tennis Classic 
Toyota Tennis Classic 
Tennis tournaments in Georgia (U.S. state)
Women's tennis tournaments in the United States